Arahuay District is one of seven districts of the province Canta in Peru.

References